The 2018 Campbell Fighting Camels football team represented Campbell University in the 2018 NCAA Division I FCS football season. They were led by sixth-year head coach Mike Minter and played their home games at Barker–Lane Stadium. They were first-year members of the Big South Conference. They finished the season 6–5, 1–4 in Big South play to finish in fifth place.

Previous season
The Fighting Camels finished the 2017 season 6–5, 5–3 in PFL play to finish in a three-way tie for third place. This was Campbell's final season in the PFL.

Preseason

Big South poll
In the Big South preseason poll released on July 23, 2018, the Fighting Camels were predicted to finish in fifth place.

Preseason All-Big South team
The Big South released their preseason all-Big South team on July 23, 2018, with the Fighting Camels having one player selected along with two more on the honorable mention list.

Defense

Jack Ryan – LB

Honorable mention

Aaron Blockmon – WR

Jaquan Brooks – PR

Award watch lists

Schedule

Source:

Game summaries

Chowan

at Georgetown

Coastal Carolina

Shaw

North Alabama

Wagner

at Monmouth

Gardner–Webb

at Kennesaw State

at Presbyterian

Charleston Southern

References

Campbell
Campbell Fighting Camels football seasons
Campbell Fighting Camels football